The Association of Newspaper and Magazine Wholesalers (ANMW) is a trade association that represents the interests of newspaper & magazine wholesalers across the United Kingdom.  It is currently based in Reading, Berkshire.

History
The ANMW was formed in 1904 when three wholesalers in Lancashire joined forces to form a wholesale trade association. This quickly grew to include wholesalers in Yorkshire, Leeds and Sheffield. In 1908 the group became known as The Provincial Wholesaler Association (PWNA), the first recognised body in England and Wales to work together on matters concerning the wholesale trade.

Membership
The ANMW is a non-profit making organisation with admission agreed by the membership. Applicants must be wholesalers of national newspapers or hold two out of the three major magazine distributor contracts.

Affiliate membership is also available for those with a limited product range or fewer than 150 retail customers.

External links
ANMW Web Site

Communications and media organisations based in the United Kingdom
Organizations established in 1904